In mathematics, Bender–Dunne polynomials are a two-parameter family of sequences of orthogonal polynomials studied by .  They may be defined by the recursion:

 , 
  , 

and for :

 

References

Orthogonal polynomials